FC Tufagorts, is a defunct Armenian football club from the town of Artik, Shirak Province.

The club was dissolved in 1995 and is currently inactive from professional football.

League Record

References

Tufagorts
1995 disestablishments in Armenia